= Japan Academy for Asian Market Economies =

Japanese academic society

The Japan Academy for Asian Market Economies (JAFAME) is a Japanese academic society established in 1997 for research on Asian market economies. The society brings together researchers and practitioners in economics, business administration, marketing, and related fields. It is affiliated with the Union of National Economic Associations in Japan.

== History ==
JAFAME was established on 22 November 1997 during the period of the Asian financial crisis. The society was founded to promote historical, theoretical, and empirical research on Asian market economies.

== Activities ==
The academy organizes annual conferences, regional research meetings, and publishes the Annual Journal of the Japan Academy for Asian Market Economies.
